Rose Hall is a community in the East Berbice-Corentyne Region of Guyana. Rose Hall is 14 miles east of New Amsterdam.

History
Rose Hall was once owned by Dutch planters and later purchased by former slaves. In 1908, it acquired village status; and it wasn't until 1970 that it became a town. Rose Hall has an area of 13 km2 and a population of about 8,000.

Rose Hall is divided into three wards: Middle Rose Hall, East Rose Hall and Williamsburg.

Points of interest
Rose Hall is a hub for the surrounding areas where people buy raw materials for clothing and grocery in the Berbice region. Two banks and stores lined the main public roads. Most of the stores are clothing stores and grocery stores. The Welfare Centre Ground is a cricket ground that formerly held first-class cricket matches.

Notable people
Nezam Hafiz (1969–2001), Guyanese-American cricketer, killed in the September 11, 2001 attacks on New York City.
Godfrey Edwards (born 1959), Dutch cricketer of Guyanese origin.

References

Populated places in East Berbice-Corentyne